Grêmio Mangaratibense, sometimes known as Mangaratibense, is a Brazilian football club based in Mangaratiba, Rio de Janeiro state.

Founded on 21 January 2009 as a replacement to dissolved Grêmio Olímpico Mangaratiba, the club played his first appearance in Campeonato Carioca Série C in 2010. It achieved promotion to Série B in 2013, after finishing fourth.

Stadium
Mangaratibense play their home games at Estádio Municipal José Maria de Brito Barros.

External links
 
FFERJ profile 

Association football clubs established in 2009
Football clubs in Rio de Janeiro (state)
2009 establishments in Brazil